Ashadha or Aashaadha or Aadi ( Āsāṛh or  Āṣāḍh;  ahar;  Āṣāḍh; ;  aáṛ;  asār) is a month of the Hindu calendar that corresponds to June/July in the Gregorian calendar. In India's national civil calendar, this month is the fourth month of the year, beginning on 22 June and ending on 22 July. In Vedic Jyotish, Āsāṛh begins with the Sun's entry into Gemini. It is the first of the two months that comprise the monsoon season.

The corresponding month in the Bengali calendar, Aṣaṛh ( "Monsoon"), is the third month.

In lunar religious calendars, Āsāṛh begins on a new moon and is usually the fourth month of the year.

Events

Festivals
Rath Yatra that is dedicated to Jagannath is held in the month of Asadha every year in Puri and other places.

Guru Purnima, a festival dedicated to the Guru, is celebrated on the Purnima (Full Moon) day of the month. Prior to it Shayani Ekadashi, is observed on the eleventh lunar day (Ekadashi) of the bright fortnight (Shukla paksha). "" is an important festival in Tamil Nadu and auspicious for Amman.

In many parts of Nepal, the arrival of monsoon marks a special time for cultivating rice. This occasion starts with farmers, men and women, planting rice while singing plantation songs. The farmers then participate in the mud festival, throwing mud at each other and welcoming the monsoon season. The festival ends with people sharing "" (literally "beaten rice with curds") with each other.

Kakkada month in Kodava calendar in Coorg, is considered one of the significant and auspicious days. ,  are the delicacies prepared on this day.

See also

 Hindu units of measurement
 Hindu astronomy
 Jyotish

References

External Links 
Significance, festivals and fasting of Ashadha month

04